is a Japanese webcomic, later adapted as a manga and an anime series, by Hidekaz Himaruya. The series' main presentation is as an often over-the-top allegory of political and historic events as well as more general cultural comparisons. Characters are personifications of countries, regions such as Hong Kong, and micronations with little reference to other national personifications. Both positive and negative cultural stereotypes form part of each character's personality.

The main storyline's events occur during World War II, but the vast majority of the comics take place during other historical events, modern holidays, or at no specific time whatsoever. The series often uses satire and light-hearted comedy to reinterpret well-known events as well as less common historical and cultural trivia. Historical, political, economic, and military interaction between countries is generally represented in Hetalia as social interactions and misunderstandings between the characters.

Himaruya originally created Hetalia as a webcomic, and so far six tankōbon have been published by Gentosha Comics, the first on March 28, 2008, the second on December 10, 2008, the third on May 20, 2010, the fourth on June 30, 2011, and the fifth on July 31, 2012. English translations of the first two volumes have been published by Tokyopop in the United States, the United Kingdom and Canada. Both printed volumes published so far have topped The New York Times manga best seller list. As of May 2012 the English-language version of the manga was published by Tokyopop via Right Stuf Inc. The series was later adapted into drama CDs, and an anime series created by Studio Deen has also begun streaming online. As of January 8, 2010, the anime series' international distribution is being handled by Funimation.

Characters

So far, over 60 countries and territories have been depicted. There have also been historical figures depicted, such as (but not limited to) Maria Theresa, Roman emperors, Napoleon Bonaparte, Leonardo da Vinci and Jeanne d'Arc. There are also personifications of other figures, like General Winter, the United Nations, Italy's tanks and every country's Mr. Newspaper.

The following countries are the 8 main roles in this manga.

Axis powers

The Axis Powers group of characters consists primarily of Germany, Italy, and Japan (the Axis Powers of World War II)

, usually shortened to just  is the primary protagonist and the title character, portrayed as a bright, energetic, and mostly sweet young man. In the series, he is depicted at various points as the infant grandson of the Roman Empire and is recognized as one of the weakest characters in the series as well as a carefree and cowardly soldier who often surrenders without a fight, usually by waving a white flag. His artistry and love of pasta and pizza are references to stereotypical Italian culture. He uses his adorable ways and cute face to charm girls he meets. He is portrayed as a "loveable loser". Despite looking weak and helpless, Italy is viewed as being strong as a child, being able to defeat Turkey single-handedly during his golden days. According to Himaruya, Italy is strong, but doesn't show his strength because of his cowardice. In 2008, he received the name Feliciano Vargas.

Italy Veneziano represents the northern half of the country, while his older brother Romano represents the southern half. Hence, their full character names are Italy Veneziano and Italy Romano respectively. In the anime series, both Veneziano and Romano are voiced by Daisuke Namikawa in Japanese. In English, Veneziano is voiced by Todd Haberkorn and Romano is voiced by Ian Sinclair. Young Italy, from a common segment on the show called Chibitalia, is voiced by Aki Kanada in Japanese and Brina Palencia in English.

It was the Kingdom of Italy during World War I and World War II , and the Italian Social Republic from its establishment in 1943 until its dissolution in 1945.

 is viewed as a hard-working, efficient, bureaucratic, and serious man. In the series Germany is primus inter pares among the Axis Powers, and takes responsibility for the training of Italy and Japan. He is tall, muscular, with blond hair and blue eyes (possibly a reference to the Nazi concept of an Aryan Master Race) and usually wears military fatigues, uniforms, formal wear, or a collared shirt. Although he has a tendency to act aggressively to other characters he encounters (in particular Italy and Japan), he can sometimes show a kinder side to his personality. He is also an established baker. Another aspect of his character is his relative inexperience with relationships, leading him to be very by-the-book as a result of the belief that things will go wrong if he does not follow instructions to the letter. Despite this, as the series progresses, he establishes friendship with Italy and Japan. In the anime series, he is voiced by Hiroki Yasumoto in Japanese and Patrick Seitz in English. In 2008, he received the name Ludwig.

World War I was the German Empire, and World War II was Nazi Germany.

 is a reclusive and hard-working man. He seems to have a problem with others being in his personal space, for he gets uncomfortable if anyone touches him or gets too close, though he does seem to have gotten used to this to some extent. In the series, he is shown to be inexperienced with the Western world, and prone to culture shock; but he also finds fascination in the ways of other nations since he takes photographs of cultural oddities in other countries' lands. His character design features dark brown eyes and black hair, common physical traits among Japanese people; and has the attire of an officer of the Japanese Navy. He often tries to adopt the cultures of other countries he meets such as France, or when other countries meet him (such as America). He "senses the mood and refrains from speaking". Generally quiet, he is often depicted with the attitude of a businesslike old man. In the anime series, he is voiced by Hiroki Takahashi in Japanese and Christopher Bevins in English. Young Japan is voiced by Alexis Tipton in English. In 2008, he received the name Kiku Honda (eastern order: Honda Kiku).

In World War I and World War II, it was the Empire of Japan.

Allied Forces

The Allied Powers consist primarily of the characters America, England, France, Russia, Canada, and China. These characters are often depicted as comically failing to reach consensus in their war meetings. The representations of countries that were also part of the historical Allies of World War Two make additional appearances.

 is an energetic young man. In the series, he was found by France and England (at first) before France left him in England's care after America chose the latter over the former, then later grows distant from him which eventually leads to him fighting for his independence.

America is very similar in appearance to his brother, Canada, who is often mistaken for America. America has blond hair, starry blue eyes, glasses representing Texas, and a noticeable cowlick representing Nantucket. In the World War II sections of the anime and manga, America wears an American Army Air Force Officer uniform, and a vintage leather flight jacket. He is the self-proclaimed leader of the Allied Forces, and his catchphrase is "I'm the hero!"

Although his ideas for solving international problems are often absurd, and he is usually oblivious to the opinions of others, it has been stated that he acts this way purposely. America's ideas and inventions are grand, but rarely go anywhere. He is often portrayed as loud, obnoxious, egotistical, immature, childlike and interfering with other characters' businesses with little regard for whom his actions affect. Yet despite his misgivings, he is shown to be a kind-hearted person who cares deeply for his friends. He is also shown to be extremely intelligent in several fields.

He is a brave adventurer and natural explorer, wanting to try things no one has ever done before, and he usually spends his free time either trying new foods, being around friends, or making movies and has a fascination with superheroes which he aspires to be himself. He has a prominent case of phasmophobia, which is ironic considering his friendly acquaintance with an alien named Tony, who lives in his house.

America is frequently seen clutching a hamburger or eating while speaking, yet he is self-conscious of his unhealthy habits and tries several yet ineffective diets to stay healthy. He also has uncanny superhuman strength, being able to lift objects several times his size. In the anime series, his voice actor is Katsuyuki Konishi in Japanese and Eric Vale in English, both of whom also voice Canada. As a child, America's voice actress is Ai Iwamura in Japanese and Luci Christian in English. In 2008, he received the name Alfred F. Jones.

 More commonly known as England or Britain is the personification of England and acting representation of the United Kingdom. He is depicted as an irritable man with big, bushy eyebrows drawn with five lines. While before he was a zealous privateer, he is now a cynical and sharp-tongued gentleman whose notable character traits include terrible cooking skills, inability to hold liquor, foul mouth, ability to see supernatural creatures, and (in)ability to perform magic curses.

He is usually recognized for his rather large eyebrows, blond hair (more in a punk-like style), green eyes, and his green Royal Artillery Officer's uniform. In the English release of the anime, when asked why they opted to choose the name "Britain" over "England", Funimation explained that it was a request from the Japanese studio. Tokyopop, the English publisher of the manga, refers to him as "England."

Britain is most antagonistic towards France, with whom he shares a long rivalry, and has strong mixed feelings towards America, whom he raised from a small child.

In one strip, he notes that he has an older brother named Scotland. Himaruya has confirmed that England represents both the United Kingdom and England, while Scotland, Northern Ireland, and Wales are his siblings. Among England's other 'relations' are Sealand, a micronation whom England considers to be an annoying little brother due to his continued attempts to get other countries to recognize him as an independent country. England's voice actor is Noriaki Sugiyama, and his English voice actor was Scott Freeman but due to sex offences,  Funimation cut off all ties with him. He was replaced by Taliesin Jaffe in The World Twinkle. Taliesin did not reprise his role in the later season of "Hetalia World Stars" and the voice actor was changed to Steven Kelly. In 2008, he received the name Arthur Kirkland.

It was the British Empire during the World war. 

 is an overly-romantic, carefree man. In the series, he is shown to have a long-held rivalry with England. He makes sexual passes at many characters. France explains away his long history of military defeats as a joke from God, but he believes he is gifted with his "charms" and his supreme cooking skills. He regards himself as the eldest brother among the European nations and is referred to as such by some of them, though he calls Spain his elder brother in turn. Most of the time, he does not bother remembering to speak English, instead using French, the "Language of Love". He has long blond hair, clear blue eyes, and usually wears a purple cathedral cloak. In the anime series, he is voiced by Masaya Onosaka in Japanese and J. Michael Tatum in English. In 2008, he received the name Francis Bonnefoy.

World War I was the French Third Republic, and World War II was Free France.

, is the tallest of all the nations, and has a thick muscular body. He has wavy silver hair, purple eyes, a large nose, and wears a thick winter coat and a silk scarf. Russia has a seemingly kind demeanor, but has suffered mental trauma following the strain of his bloody history, and as a result he has the innocence and cruelty of a child; sometimes he casts an aura of pure evil around him whenever such malicious thoughts enter his mind. He often terrifies the other countries without even trying, especially when he was the Soviet Union. He would abuse the Baltics and still stalks them in the modern day, especially Lithuania. Occasionally, he stalks China, while in a panda costume; and he holds a subtle rivalry with the Western nations, especially America. His primary target of resentment is General Winter, because despite using the cold to his advantage in war, he is also attacked by him every year. Russia has also been known to want Lithuania and other countries to become one with him. Russia also has two sisters: his older sister, Ukraine and his younger sister, Belarus. He becomes gloomy and depressed when either of them are on his mind, because Ukraine left him to try to make friends in the EU, and Belarus is obsessed with the idea of forcing him to marry her. Belarus seems to be the only other country which Russia fears. Russia happily promises that eventually "all will become one with Russia". He dreams of living in a warm place surrounded by sunflowers, and vodka is his fuel. He says "kolkolkol" to threaten his subordinates when he is angered. Russia is often seen carrying a metal faucet pipe. In the anime series, he is voiced by Yasuhiro Takato in Japanese and Jerry Jewell in English. In 2008, he received the name Ivan Braginsky.

During World War I, it was the Russian Empire; It was the Soviet Union during World War II, and then the Dissolution of the Soviet Union, and fifteen republics including Russia became independent.

 is the oldest nation in the Allies, being depicted as immortal as well as being over four or five thousand years old, and is regarded as the eldest sibling among the East Asian nations. He claims he is the big brother of Japan and often depicted as a panda. His boss was introduced as a green Chinese dragon with an intimidating appearance. During the fight between the Axis and Allies, he fights Germany and Japan with a wok and ladle, which became his weapon of choice which also serves as a stereotype that China serves good food. He is a big fan of Hello Kitty and tends to end his sentences with the suffix -aru, the Japanese pronunciation of "er", a phrase sometimes added to the end of words in Chinese (see Kyowa-go). However, he replaces the customary -aru with the suffix -ahen, which means opium, when speaking to England, as a reference to the Opium Wars. He is a bit disturbed by and distrustful of Russia, reflecting Tsarist Russia invaded China and occupied Vladivostok before. In the anime series, he is voiced by Yuki Kaida (who also voices Taiwan) in Japanese and Clarine Harp in English. In 2008, he received the name Yao Wang (eastern order: Wang Yao)

During World War I, China was the Beiyang government of the Republic of China with five colored flags; During World War II, China was the Republic of China (during the mainland period of the Republic of China), and was called the "Four Policemen" of the Allied Powers together with Britain, the United States and the Soviet Union. 

Canada (カナダ Kanada) is a part of the Allies, and he is usually forgotten about within the show. When characters notice him, they tend to think that he is his brother, America, which mostly doesn't end up well due to the fact that many countries dislike him. To avoid getting confused, he tattooed a maple leaf to his head, but America put an American flag on his head instead. He has a polar bear, named Kumajiro (くまじろう, translates to: white bear) who also forgets who he is. In return, Canada can never remember his bear's name, calling it other names such as Kumachika. On the Christmas special, his bear remembers his name and he states that he might have already received his gift. He is voiced by Katsuyuki Konishi in Japanese, and Eric Vale in English. In 2008, he received the name Matthew Williams.

Media

Manga
The original Hetalia: Axis Powers webcomic was reworked and expanded into six tankōbon and published by Gentosha Comics under the manga imprint Birz Extra. The first volume was released on March 28, 2008, the second on December 10, 2008, the third on May 20, 2010, the fourth on June 30, 2011, and the fifth on July 31, 2012. There is soon to be a seventh volume of the Hetalia manga books, although this seventh book will be the first volume of Hetalia: World Stars. Every tankōbon except the first were released as a standard edition and a special edition that included an extra small booklet. The first two volumes sold over a million copies by late 2009.

In January 2009 Anime News Network reported that the series would also begin serialization in Gentosha's seinen manga magazine Comic Birz starting in the April issue, but this was later announced to be a publishing error. The Gentosha press release on which ANN had based their article actually referred to a new series by Himaruya, Chibisan Date. Amazon.com has listed Hetalia: Axis Powers as being licensed by Tokyopop for a North American release, with the first volume released on September 21, 2010. After Tokyopop withdrew from the English language market in 2011, Right Stuf has been publishing the Hetalia manga in English since May 2012. On July 7, 2013, Tokyopop announced via their Facebook page that Tokyopop and Right Stuf are teaming up to release Hetalia Volumes 4 and 5 in Winter 2013.

Drama CDs
Hetalia: Axis Powers has been adapted into a series of drama CDs, and so far nine have been released. An independently produced CD that was recorded prior to voice casting of the anime (Axis Powers Hetalia: The CD) was released on September 14, 2008. The first official CD (Hetalia Drama CD: Prologue) was released on August 29, 2008, the second (Hetalia Drama CD: Volume 1) on October 24, 2008, the third (Hetalia Drama CD: Prologue 2) on December 29, 2008, the fourth (Hetalia Drama CD: Volume 2) on June 3, 2009, the fifth (Hetalia Drama CD Interval Vol.1: The CD Of The Awesome Me) on August 15, 2009, the sixth (Hetalia Fantasia) on August 27, 2009, the seventh (Hetalia Drama CD Interval Vol.2: Boss CD) on December 8, 2010, and the eighth (Hetalia Fantasia 2) on December 10, 2010. A ninth official Drama CD based on the Gakuen Hetalia PSP game was released in 2011.

Anime

An anime adaptation of Hetalia: Axis Powers was announced on July 24, 2008. It is directed by Bob Shirohata (Gravitation, Diamond Daydreams) and is animated by Studio Deen. It was originally scheduled for broadcast on Kids Station on January 24, 2009 but was later canceled. The cancellation only affected the Kids Stations broadcasts; plans to make the series available through mobile phone and Internet streaming were not affected. The controversies arose when numerous Korean protesters called for the cancellation of the series, claiming that the personified character of Korea was an insulting representation of Koreans. Kids Station claimed that the Korea character does not appear in the anime and that it was "unaware of the criticism in Korea," and cited "various circumstances" as being behind the decision to cancel its airing of the anime, but they did not provide further information as to the nature of these circumstances. A second 26-episode season of Hetalia: Axis Powers was announced on April 16, 2009, and a third was announced on December 10, 2009. As of March 7, 2010, the title of the anime has been changed to Hetalia: World Series. A fourth season had been announced for Hetalia and premiered on September 10, 2010. This season featured the new characters Denmark and Norway.

On January 8, 2010, Funimation announced it had acquired the rights to release the first and second seasons of Hetalia in North America. Funimation later began streaming Hetalia on their website, Hulu, and YouTube with Japanese audio and English subtitles and announced that characters would have accents in the English dub. Via Twitter, Funimation clarified that the series was rated TV-MA due to "some instances of profanity, crude humor and adult situations", and that they base ratings on entire series rather than individual episodes. The first DVD was released on September 14, 2010. Funimation have announced at Otakon 2010, that they have the license the Hetalia: World Series and will simulcast the episodes and release them on DVD in 2011. In the UK, the series will be distributed by Manga Entertainment.

Certain Animate stores will carry Hetalia-themed Purikura booths for a limited time, with a total of 10 anime sticker options.

The series has made its North American television debut on December 23, 2010 on the Funimation Channel.

The fifth season of Hetalia, titled Hetalia: The Beautiful World, was announced in the September 2012 edition of Comic Birz. It was announced that it would be produced by a new staff and utilize a new illustrative style. Romania also appeared as a new character. On June 21, 2013, Hetalia: The Beautiful World concluded. It was released in an English dubbed version on July 22, 2014 by Funimation.

A sixth season of Hetalia, titled Hetalia: The World Twinkle, was announced in the January 2015 edition of Comic Birz. It began airing in July 2015 and concluded in October 2015. It was released with an English dub on November 8, 2016 by Funimation.

An original net anime (ONA) adaptation of the Hetalia: World Stars side story manga was announced in October 2020.  It aired from April 1 to June 17, 2021. Funimation licensed the series.

Film
A feature-length animated film adaptation was announced on September 23, 2009, and was released on June 5, 2010. The film is entitled Paint it, White! and the eight main characters as well as supporting characters such as Liechtenstein, Sealand, Prussia, Finland, Cuba, Hungary, Austria, Switzerland, Romano, Belarus, Ukraine, Greece, Poland, Canada, Iceland, Spain and Baltics appear throughout the film. The main plot of the movie involves a vast majority of characters being transformed into grey-white faceless aliens called Pictonians. At Otakon 2010, Funimation Entertainment announced the license of the film. The English dubbed version made its premiere at the Anime Weekend Atlanta convention, taking place from September 30 to October 2, 2011. It was released on November 22, 2011, and each DVD came with a green bandana as a bonus.

Video games
A single-player video game based on the anime titled  of the action/adventure-comic genre was released on March 24, 2011 on the PlayStation Portable in Japan. It was developed by Otomate and published by Idea Factory. A spin-off mobile game, Hetalia Chibi Carnival, was released for the iOS App Store on December 20, 2010.

Musical
A musical called "Hetalia ~Singin' in the World~" based on the manga series ran from December 24–29 at the Zepp Blue Theater Roppongi. The script was written by Yūsei Naruse, and the play was directed by Kōtarō Yoshitani. The cast included Ryōki Nagae (Legend of the Galactic Heroes, Satomi Hakkenden) as Italy, Yūichirō Ōmi (D-BOYS) as Germany, Keisuke Ueda (Yowamushi Pedal) as Japan, Ryūko Isogai as America, Daisuke Hirose as England, Juri Aikawa as France, Yūki Yamaoki as Russia, Taishi Sugie as China and Takuya Kikuchi as Austria. Another musical titled "Hetalia The Great World" ran from November 10–20, 2016 at Theatre 1010, Tokyo and November 26–27 at the Morinomiya Piloti Hall, Osaka. The "Hetalia ~Singin' in the World~" cast returned except for Yūichirō Ōmi, who was replaced by Yūsuke Ueda, and Takuya Kikuchi, whose role as Austria did not appear. The original writer, director, and composer also returned for the new production.

Reception
Both volumes of the printed manga version of Hetalia: Axis Powers have topped The New York Times manga best seller list. Volume 1 topped the list on October 10, 2010, and Volume 2 topped the list on January 16, 2011. Volume 1 has been in the top ten for twenty-one weeks and Volume 2 for fourteen weeks.

Readers reviews of the British magazine NEO gave positive to mixed reviews for the anime version.

A review for the second season of Hetalia, also in NEO, by Matt Kamen gave the DVD of the season four stars, each for the program and the DVD extras. Kamen wrote that "[D]espite its risqué jokes and abundance of national stereotypes, Hetalia thankfully manages to stay on just the right side of casual comedy racism — maybe that's why we don't feel too bad laughing uproariously at the dub, particularly Japan's heavy 'Engrish' accent! It's best not to ask too many questions of this show — instead, just sit back and enjoy while Hetalia conquers your world".

Hetalia won the 2011 NEO Award for "Best Manga" in a public vote.

Fans of the series have spawned a yearly meetup titled "Hetalia Day" where fans gather at various locations to celebrate the series. The meetup started in 2009 and every year since then, coinciding with United Nations Day (October 24) or the weekend closest to it if UN Day falls on a weekday. These meetups are often found on their website, as advertised by Hetalia's official Twitter account. As of July 14, 2020, the @HetaliaOfficial Twitter account has 17.5k followers.

See also

 Afghanis-tan
 Polandball
 Patalliro!
 Year Hare Affair

References

External links

 Official Gentosha Comics Hetalia: Axis Powers website 
 Official Hetalia anime website 
 "Hetalia Day" website
 Official Hetalia musical website 
 Hetalia: Axis Powers at Funimation
 

2000s webcomics
2003 webcomic debuts
2006 manga
2009 anime ONAs
2010 anime films
2021 anime ONAs
Anime and manga controversies
Anti-Korean sentiment in Japan
Comics set during World War II
Ethnic and racial stereotypes
Funimation
Gentosha manga
Historical anime and manga
Historical webcomics
Japanese comedy webcomics
Moe anthropomorphism
National personifications in comic books
Seinen manga
Shōnen manga
Shueisha franchises
Shueisha manga
Studio Deen
Tokyopop titles
Webcomics in print
Works about micronations
Yonkoma